Gongbo'gyamda County is a county of Nyingchi (or Nyingtri) City in the Tibet Autonomous Region, lying approximately  east of Lhasa at its central point.

History
In 1587, Gyampo Monastery was established. Subsequently, a town named "Gyamda", meaning "valley outlet of Gyampo", was developed near the monastery. The region was originally under control of Derge Gyalpos. After the Qing Dynasty took over Derge, the region was managed by the Tibetan Government as Gyamda Dzong. In 1960, Gyamda Dzong merged with West Dengke Dzong to form the modern Gongbo'gyamda Dzong.

Geography

Gongbo'gyamda County is located in the east of the Tibet Autonomous Region, to the south of the Nyainqentanglha Mountains, to the north of the Yarlung Tsangpo River and in the area of the middle branches of the Nyang River. With a population of 22,000, the county covers an area of 12,886 square kilometres. The average altitude of the county is 3,500 metres above sea level. The Pagsum Lake, with a total area of 26 square kilometres, is a famous lake.

Transport 
China National Highway 318

Economy and reserves
Water resources are abundant in Gongbo'gyamda County. The species of animals include leopard, red deer, black bear, brown bear, otter, monkey and black-necked crane, etc. There are almost a hundred of species of plants in the county, such as Yartsa Gunbu, fritillaria and snow lotus, etc.

Block raising is the main industry of the county. The Sichuan-Tibet Highway crosses the county. The total length of all roads reaches .

Villages

Zhongsa Village

References

External links
 Gongbo'gyamda County Annals

Counties of Tibet
Nyingchi